The Dead may refer to:

 The dead, those who have experienced death

Arts, entertainment, and media

Literature
 The Dead (Higson novel), 2010 novel by Charlie Higson
 The Dead (Kracht novel), 2016 novel by Christian Kracht
 "The Dead" (poem), by Rupert Brooke
 "The Dead" (Joyce short story), by James Joyce
 "The Dead" (Swanwick short story), by Michael Swanwick
 The Dead, a novel by Ingrid Black

Film
 The Dead (1987 film), adapted from the James Joyce short story
 The Dead (2010 film), a 2010 horror film
 The Dead 2: India (2013), a sequel to the 2010 film

Music
The Dead (album), 1987 album by Theatre of Ice
 The Dead (band), a rock band composed of former members of the Grateful Dead
 The Dead, a nickname for the band  The Grateful Dead

Stage productions
 James Joyce's The Dead, Broadway musical

Places
De Dodes Fjord (The Fjord of the Dead)

See also
Dead (disambiguation)
Death (disambiguation)